The 2017 Ricoh Open was a tennis tournament played on outdoor grass courts. It was the 28th edition of the Rosmalen Grass Court Championships, and part of the 250 Series of the 2017 ATP World Tour, and of the WTA International tournaments of the 2017 WTA Tour. Both the men's and the women's events took place at the Autotron park in Rosmalen, 's-Hertogenbosch in the Netherlands, from June 12 through June 18, 2017.

Nicolas Mahut was the two-time defending champion, but lost in the second round to Julien Benneteau. Gilles Müller won the title, defeating Ivo Karlović in the final, 7–6(7–5), 7–6(7–4).

Seeds
The top four seeds receive a bye into the second round.

Draw

Finals

Top half

Bottom half

Qualifying

Seeds

Qualifiers

Lucky losers

Qualifying draw

First qualifier

Second qualifier

Third qualifier

Fourth qualifier

References
 Main Draw
 Qualifying Draw

2017 ATP World Tour
2017 Men's Singles